Roxita szetschwanella is a moth in the family Crambidae. It was described by Aristide Caradja in 1931. It is found in China.

References

Crambinae
Moths described in 1931